Yula is an archaeological site of the Maya civilization of pre-Columbian Mesoamerica. 

Yula or YULA may also refer to:
Yula (moth), genus of moth
Yula (name)
Yula (river), Russia
Yeshiva University High Schools of Los Angeles, a private Orthodox Jewish high school in Los Angeles, California

See also
Jula (disambiguation)